Roman Serhiyovych Slyva (born 23 September 2000) is a Ukrainian professional football defender.

Career
Slyva is a product of the FC Karpaty Lviv School Sportive System

He made his debut for FC Karpaty as the substituted player in the winning away match against FC Vorskla Poltava on 24 February 2019 in the Ukrainian Premier League.

References

External links

 

2000 births
Living people
Sportspeople from Rivne
Ukrainian footballers
Association football defenders
Ukrainian Premier League players
Ukrainian First League players
Ukrainian Second League players
Ukraine youth international footballers
FC Karpaty Lviv players
FC VPK-Ahro Shevchenkivka players